Kinare may refer to:

Kinare (Tribes), name of sub-tribes in Kenya.
Kinare language, a Southern Nilotic language cluster mainly known as Ogiek language.

See also
Kinaree
Kinareh